Kaleinaung Subtownshipis a subtownship of Yebyu Township, Dawei District in the Taninthayi Division of Myanmar. The main town is Kaleinaung, located by the Dawei River.

References

External links
Heinze and Kaleinaung Reserved Forest

Subtownships of Tanintharyi Region